Moosalamoo National Recreation Area is one of two national recreation areas in the Green Mountain National Forest in the U.S. state of Vermont. The recreation area is located between Middlebury and Brandon in the northern half of the Green Mountain National Forest. The area consists of  surrounding Mount Moosalamoo.

The Moosalamoo National Recreation Area was created by the New England Wilderness Act of 2006. The area is administered by the U.S. Forest Service.

References

External links
 Moosalamoo Association website
 Moosalamoo National Recreation Area at the U.S. Forest Service

National Recreation Areas of the United States
Protected areas of Addison County, Vermont
Protected areas established in 2007
2007 establishments in Vermont